Niphona is a genus of longhorn beetles of the subfamily Lamiinae, containing the following species:

subgenus Hammatoniphona
 Niphona longicornis (Pic, 1926)

subgenus Niphona
 Niphona affinis Breuning, 1938
 Niphona albofasciata Breuning, 1938
 Niphona albolateralis Pic, 1926
 Niphona alboplagiata Breuning, 1938
 Niphona albosignatipennis Breuning, 1968
 Niphona andamana Breuning, 1974
 Niphona andamanica Breuning, 1938
 Niphona appendiculata Gerstaecker, 1871
 Niphona appendiculatoides Breuning, 1964
 Niphona arrogans Pascoe, 1862
 Niphona batesi Gahan, 1895
 Niphona belligerans Pesarini & Sabbadini, 1997
 Niphona borneana Breuning, 1973
 Niphona borneensis Breuning, 1938
 Niphona cantonensis Pic, 1936
 Niphona celebensis Breuning, 1961
 Niphona chapaensis Pic, 1936
 Niphona chinensis Breuning, 1938
 Niphona crampeli Breuning, 1961
 Niphona dessumi Breuning, 1961
 Niphona excisa Pascoe, 1862  
 Niphona falaizei Breuning, 1962
 Niphona fasciculata (Pic, 1917)
 Niphona furcata (Bates, 1873)
 Niphona fuscatrix (Fabricius, 1792)
 Niphona gracilior Breuning, 1952
 Niphona grisea Breuning, 1938
 Niphona hepaticolor (Heller, 1923)
 Niphona hookeri Gahan, 1900
 Niphona indica Breuning, 1938
 Niphona javana Franz, 1971
 Niphona lateraliplagiata Breuning & Itzinger, 1943
 Niphona lateralis White, 1858
 Niphona laterialba Breuning, 1938
 Niphona lateriplagiata Breuning, 1943
 Niphona longesignata Pic, 1936
 Niphona lumawigi Breuning, 1980
 Niphona lunulata (Pic, 1926)
 Niphona lutea (Pic, 1925)
 Niphona malaccensis Breuning, 1938
 Niphona mediofasciata Breuning, 1968
 Niphona micropuncticollis Breuning & Chujô, 1961
 Niphona nigrohumeralis Breuning, 1938
 Niphona obliquata Breuning, 1938
 Niphona obscura Breuning, 1938
 Niphona orientalis Breuning, 1938
 Niphona ornata Gahan, 1895
 Niphona ornatoides Breuning, 1938
 Niphona pannosa Pascoe, 1862
 Niphona parallela White, 1858
 Niphona paraparallela Breuning, 1979
 Niphona philippinensis Breuning, 1964
 Niphona picticornis Mulsant, 1839
 Niphona plagiata White, 1858
 Niphona plagiatoides Breuning, 1938
 Niphona plagifera Aurivillius, 1925
 Niphona pluricristata Pesarini & Sabbadini, 1999
 Niphona princeps Gahan, 1894
 Niphona proxima Breuning, 1938
 Niphona regisfernandi Paiva, 1860
 Niphona rondoni Breuning, 1962
 Niphona similis Breuning, 1938
 Niphona stoetzneri Breuning, 1938
 Niphona stramentosa Breuning, 1938
 Niphona subgrisea Breuning, 1973
 Niphona sublutea Breuning, 1964
 Niphona subobscura Breuning, 1968
 Niphona sumatrana Breuning, 1942
 Niphona tibialis Gahan, 1893
 Niphona variegata Breuning, 1938
 Niphona vicina Gahan, 1896
 Niphona yanoi Matsushita, 1934

References

 
Pteropliini